WCW Monday Nitro, also known as WCW Nitro or simply Nitro, is an American professional wrestling television program that was produced by World Championship Wrestling (WCW) and broadcast weekly every Monday night on TNT in the United States from September 4, 1995 to March 26, 2001.

Created by Eric Bischoff and Ted Turner, the show's premiere was notable for sparking a period of television known as the "Monday Night Wars". For the entirety of the show's run, Nitro went head-to-head in the ratings with the World Wrestling Federation's (WWF; now WWE) Monday Night Raw. Although comparable to Raw in popularity from the beginning, Nitro began to dominate in ratings, based largely on the strength of the New World Order (nWo), a rebellious group of wrestlers that wanted to take over WCW. Beginning in June 1996, Nitro beat Raw in the ratings for 83 consecutive weeks, forcing WWF owner Vince McMahon to usher in the more adult-oriented "Attitude Era". In April 1998, Raw beat Nitro in the ratings for the first time in almost two years. The shows would continue to trade ratings wins back and forth until November 1998 when Raw pulled ahead of Nitro for good.

Besides broadcasting from various arenas and locations across the United States and Canada, such as Mall of America in Bloomington, Minnesota (from which the very first episode was broadcast), Nitro also organized special broadcasts from the Disney-MGM Studios in Orlando in 1996; aired annual Spring Break-Out episodes from Panama City Beach, Florida or South Padre Island, Texas starting in March 1997; and filmed some episodes in Australia and the United Kingdom during the Fall of 2000.

As of June 30, 2016, all episodes are available for streaming on the WWE Network (and NBCUniversal’s Peacock streaming service). WWE has also released three Best of WCW Monday Nitro DVD sets.

History

Premiere
The first episode of Nitro was broadcast from the Mall of America in Bloomington, Minnesota on September 4, 1995. The featured matches on the one-hour broadcast were Brian Pillman versus Jushin Thunder Liger, Ric Flair versus WCW United States Heavyweight Champion Sting, and WCW World Heavyweight Champion Hulk Hogan taking on Big Bubba Rogers. The show was also highlighted by the return of Lex Luger to WCW after having spent the previous two plus years wrestling for the WWF, where he had been one of the promotion's top stars. Luger had just wrestled a match for the WWF the previous evening; the match was his final contractual obligation with the company, and Luger signed with WCW the morning of his appearance. The event prefigured the similar defections of WWF wrestlers Scott Hall and Kevin Nash the following year.

The title video for the debut episode of Nitro featured multiple shots of Big Van Vader (one of four wrestlers featured, along with Hulk Hogan, Sting and Macho Man Randy Savage), who parted ways with WCW following a backstage altercation with Paul Orndorff. Absent from the first episode, he had been scheduled to face Hogan for the WCW World Heavyweight Championship on the September 11 edition, but was replaced by Lex Luger, who issued a challenge to Hogan on the debut show. Vader would never perform on Nitro, and embarked on a WWF career in January 1996.

Monday Night Wars 

The advent of Nitro brought with it a television ratings rivalry with the WWF's Monday Night Raw, known to wrestling fans as the "Monday Night Wars". Throughout this period, Nitro would grow in popularity and eventually surpass Raw in the ratings for 83 consecutive weeks.

Since Nitro was live, the show was seen as far less predictable than its WWF counterpart. Initially only sixty minutes in length (as was Raw at the time), Nitro was expanded to two hours following the 1996 NBA Playoffs (Raw would later extend to two hours in February 1997). In January 1998, the show was extend to three hours. At its peak, the rivalry resulted in performers on either show trading verbal insults and challenges. In retaliation for a segment of Raw in which D-Generation X (D-X) travelled to the Norfolk Scope arena in Norfolk where Nitro was being broadcast  (WWF was nearby in Hampton, Virginia the same night), Eric Bischoff challenged Vince McMahon to face him in a match to be held at Slamboree 1998; McMahon never formally recognized the challenge and did not appear.

The July 6, 1998, episode of Nitro from the Georgia Dome in Atlanta saw Goldberg defeat Hollywood Hogan for the WCW World Heavyweight Championship

Nitro is best remembered for the New World Order (nWo), with former WWF wrestlers Scott Hall, Kevin Nash and "Hollywood" Hulk Hogan as rebellious heels plotting to take over the WCW. Despite ratings success, both the angle and stable would later be criticized for the heel wrestlers almost never losing, and for what was seen as overexposure. As the nWo expanded, the stable would ultimately split into several warring factions within itself, while most WCW-branded wrestlers would eventually become neutral.

Changes 
As Raw began to overtake Nitro in the ratings in 1998 thanks to WWF's Attitude Era programming, WCW was frequently criticized for several faults, including an inability to create new stars while over-relying on established stars to support ratings.

On January 4, 1999 Mick Foley, who had wrestled for WCW during the early 1990s as Cactus Jack, won the WWF Championship as Mankind on a pre-taped episode of Raw. Nitro announcer Tony Schiavone sarcastically commented on the match, which unexpectedly resulted in Nitro losing in the ratings battle when several hundred thousand viewers switched over to Raw to see the title change. That night's episode of Nitro would be notorious for the "Fingerpoke of Doom", in which a WCW World Heavyweight Championship match between Kevin Nash and Hollywood Hogan was quickly revealed to be a ruse that reunited the core members of the nWo as the "nWo Elite". The match was universally panned and was considered to have damaged WCW's credibility and begin their decline.

In October 1999, former WWF writers Vince Russo and Ed Ferrara were hired by WCW. Both men attempted to bring their WWF-style writing to Nitro, including edgier storylines, lengthier non-wrestling segments, and an increased amount of sexuality. Many WCW fans greatly resented Russo and Ferrara for changing their programming to be like the WWF, as they preferred the traditional method of wrestling over long skits, screwjobs, and risque innuendo that were widely popular among WWF audiences.

Nitro would be reduced to two hours in January 2000, returning the program to an 8-10 p.m. timeslot, with the first hour running unopposed and the second hour competing with the first hour of Raw. Eric Bischoff would be brought back to Nitro and was paired with Russo to "reboot" WCW on April 10, 2000. None of these changes were able to help recover Nitro'''s ratings and Bischoff eventually left the company in July 2000 after an incident involving Hogan and Russo at the Bash at the Beach event. Russo would later suffer a severe concussion after being speared through a cage by Goldberg, later leaving WCW on extended leave to recover.

 The Night of Champions – Final broadcast 
In an attempt to save WCW and Nitro, Bischoff attempted to purchase the company with a group of investors. However, although Bischoff's offer had been accepted, recently appointed Turner Broadcasting executive Jamie Kellner announced shortly after his arrival that Nitro and all WCW programming was immediately canceled on both TNT and TBS. Bischoff's group then withdrew their deal, as it was contingent on keeping WCW programming on some outlet. Instead, WCW's trademarks and certain assets (such as its video library and the contracts of 24 wrestlers), though not the company itself (which existed as a Time Warner-owned legal entity under the name Universal Wrestling Corporation until late 2017), were bought by Vince McMahon's WWF (now WWE), its long-time competitor.

Around the time of the cancellation, WCW was preparing to make its yearly trip to Panama City, Florida for spring break. Since the premiere of Nitro, WCW had gone to Club La Vela or South Padre Island every March to try to gain favor with adolescent and young adult viewers who might not otherwise be tuning into the program. It was announced that the upcoming March 26, 2001, episode of Nitro from Panama City (which was actually held at the nearby Boardwalk Beach Resort) was to be the finale and the show was dubbed "The Night of Champions." The show began with McMahon appearing via satellite from Gund Arena in Cleveland, Ohio, the site of that Monday's Raw is War broadcast on TNN. McMahon announced his purchase of WCW to the crowd and appeared in vignettes throughout the show, including one where he terminated WCW's Jeff Jarrett on air due to bad blood the two had in the past.

The show was unique in that all five of WCW's major championships (excluding the WCW Hardcore Championship) were defended that night and in six of the seven matches contested on the show, the faces won. (Traditionally WCW was seen as the promotion where heels were often the top stars as opposed to the WWF, where faces were often the top stars. Shawn Stasiak was the only heel to emerge victorious on the final episode of Nitro.) In addition, various WCW wrestlers were interviewed giving their honest, out-of-character responses to the selling of WCW. The co-main event of the evening was WCW World Heavyweight Champion Scott Steiner taking on WCW United States Heavyweight Champion Booker T in a match with both belts on the line; Booker defeated Steiner for his fourth WCW World Heavyweight Championship while retaining the WCW United States Heavyweight Championship.

Just as it had been on the initial Nitro, the final match of the final Nitro and the final match in WCW as a whole was between long-time WCW rivals Ric Flair and Sting, a match that was more informal than their usual encounters (Sting and Flair were seen smiling and nodding respectfully towards each other throughout the match). Sting won using his finishing move, the Scorpion Deathlock. After the match, the two competitors stood in the middle of the ring and embraced to show respect for one another.

In a closing segment, simulcast between both Nitro and Raw, Vince addressed the audience in Cleveland and gloated about the purchase, stating that he wanted Turner to personally deliver the sale contract to him so he could sign it at WrestleMania X-Seven that weekend. However, the speech was interrupted by Vince's son Shane McMahon, who announced (in kayfabe) from Nitro that he had already signed the sale contract himself, and that the WCW would continue to compete against the WWF. The twist came as part of the set up of their match at WrestleMania X-Seven, and of what would later become WWF's "Invasion" storyline.

In addition to the tape library and other intellectual properties, WWF also purchased several contracts of WCW talent, keeping many of the younger stars. Four of WCW's championships found their way into the WWF; in addition to Booker T carrying both the WCW Championship (as it was renamed) and United States Championship with him into the WWF, McMahon also signed then-WCW Cruiserweight Champion Shane Helms and then-WCW Tag Team Champions Chuck Palumbo and Sean O'Haire to contracts. Palumbo and O'Haire would defeat Team Canada (Mike Awesome and Lance Storm) on the final episode of Nitro. (The WWF scrapped the WCW Hardcore Championship, as it was officially retired immediately following the final Nitro despite no one holding it since Meng departed for the WWF in early 2001, and the WCW Cruiserweight Tag Team Championship for undisclosed reasons; Billy Kidman and Rey Mysterio were the last champions and McMahon was only able to sign Kidman to a contract at the time.)

"The Night of Champions" was the penultimate WCW broadcast, prior to the final episode of WorldWide in 5 days later on March 31, 2001. WCW Monday Nitro was the last professional wrestling program to air on TNT until the first episode of AEW Dynamite on October 2, 2019.

 Results 

 Notable episodes 

 Other notable moments 
When then-WWF Women's Champion Alundra Blayze signed with WCW in 1995 (going back to her old name of "Madusa"), she brought the WWF Women's title belt with her and threw it in a trash can on the December 18, 1995 episode of Nitro (the third week that Nitro started before the top of the hour), and the title itself would become inactive for the next three years. Many cite this incident as one of the causes of the infamous Montreal Screwjob. This infamous event would be parodied by WCW on a 2000 episode of Nitro, when Scott Hall threw the WCW World Television Championship in the trash and "Hacksaw" Jim Duggan found and claimed the belt weeks later on an episode of Saturday Night.

The only wrestler to appear on both Nitro and Raw on the same night was Rick Rude. Rude was able to appear on both shows because he was not under contract with the WWF at the time, appearing on a handshake deal with McMahon on Raw – which was still pre-recorded at the time while Nitro was broadcast live. To emphasize that only Nitro was live, Rude had a full beard on the Raw broadcast but only a mustache on Nitro.

The January 13, 1997 episode of Nitro ended with the first two minutes of the Hollywood Hogan vs. The Giant main event. Before the show went off the air, commentator Tony Schiavone announced the match was to continue during the commercial breaks of The New Adventures of Robin Hood, which premiered that night after Nitro. This resulted in the premiere episode of Robin Hood receiving high ratings due to WCW fans being lured in to watch the show for the Hogan/Giant match.

On the May 24, 1999 broadcast Bret Hart eulogizes his brother Owen who was killed in an in-ring accident at the WWF pay-per-view event Over the Edge the night before.

The rock band KISS appeared in August 1999, and debuted a wrestler named The Demon while performing "God of Thunder". According to Dean Malenko, it was the lowest rated Nitro ever.

Throughout the late summer and early fall of 1999, in an attempt to boost the show's declining ratings, WCW organized a competition to find a new member of the Nitro Girls. Over the course of eight weeks, 300 women took part in the competition; two women who successfully passed the regional auditions were subject to Internet voting by home viewers. Eight women were selected to participate in the final round of the competition, which was held on the November 8, 1999 episode of Nitro. Stacy Keibler was declared the winner of the competition after receiving the most internet votes among the eight finalists, and received a spot on the dance troupe along with a cash prize of $10,000.

 WWE home media and streaming 
Since buying the WCW video library, WWE Home Video has included many Nitro matches and segments on some of their Superstar biography DVD sets. Episodes were also streamed on WWE Classics on Demand, as part of The Monday Night Wars feature.

While the service did show episodes of Nitro, they are often edited. Some WCW entrance theme music tracks are replaced with stock WWE music. A lot of the crowd noise is also removed on most episodes and pay-per-views. Beginning in July 2007, WWE Classics on Demand began deleting content from episodes of Nitro, as matches and some references to Chris Benoit are removed. Benoit is sometimes shown in segments where he is not the main issue of the segment. This was in light of the controversy surrounding the deaths of Benoit and his family on June 24 of that year.

In April 2009, WWE Classics went back to the first episodes that aired in September 1995. These shows alternate with the current Nitro airings (December 1997 and onwards).

A 3-disc DVD entitled The Very Best of WCW Monday Nitro was produced and released by WWE on June 7, 2011. The set is narrated by former three time WCW champion Diamond Dallas Page and highlights some of the biggest matches and moments in the history of WCW Monday Nitro. The sequel, The Best of WCW Monday Nitro Vol. 2 was released on DVD and Blu-ray February 12, 2013. Followed by the final set titled, The Very best of WCW Monday Nitro Vol. 3, which was released on August 11, 2015.

As of 2016, all 288 episodes of Nitro (September 4, 1995 – March 26, 2001) are available on demand on the WWE Network.

 On-air personalities 

 Commentary teams 

(*) – Starting with the May 27, 1996 episode of Nitro, which came after a week off due to the NBA Playoffs on TNT, Nitro started using two broadcast teams for the show. Tony Schiavone and Larry Zbyszko would call the first hour of Nitro from ringside, and Eric Bischoff and Bobby Heenan would take over from their booth near the set at the top of the second hour. Starting in September 1996, Mike Tenay became a color commentator for both hours of Nitro, calling the first hour with Schiavone and Zbyszko and the second hour with Bischoff and Heenan. Usually Tenay would call the first hour from the broadcast booth separate from Schiavone and Zbyzsko's table at ringside, while he called the second hour with Bischoff and Heenan in the booth.

(**) – After Eric Bischoff joined the nWo and took on a more prominent on-screen authority figure role, Schiavone replaced Bischoff in the second hour of Nitro, thus making him the lone play-by-play commentator for the show. Unlike Tenay, Schiavone called the first hour from ringside and would call the second hour in the booth alongside Bobby Heenan and Mike Tenay. Schiavone did that until the broadcast table at ringside was done away with on the December 9, 1996 edition of Nitro. WCW, though, would eventually move the announcers back to ringside when the new Nitro set was debuted on April 5, 1999.

(***) – At the end of match between Sting and Flair, the program was simulcasted with TNN for the closing segment and Shane McMahon announces the immediate purchase of World Championship Wrestling from his father, Vince.

 Ring announcers 
 David Penzer (September 4, 1995 – March 26, 2001)
 Michael Buffer (select main events only, May 12, 1997 – March 26, 2001)

 See also 
 1995 in American television
 AEW Dynamite AEW Rampage Nitro Girls
 WCW Thunder''

References

External links 
 
 

1995 American television series debuts
2001 American television series endings
American live television series
English-language television shows
TNT (American TV network) original programming
Nitro